Tereshkov (feminine: Tereshkova) is a Russian surname. It may refer to:

Alexey Tereshkov, Soviet general
Valentina Tereshkova, Soviet cosmonaut, first woman in space
Olga Tereshkova,  Kazakh former sprinter who specialized in the 400 metres.

See also
Terekhov

Russian-language surnames